Notophycis is a genus of morid cods.

Species
The currently recognized species in this genus are:
 Notophycis fitchi Sazonov, 2001
 Notophycis marginata (Günther, 1878) (dwarf codling)

References

Moridae